Silver Lake may refer to one of twenty-two lakes and two dispersed rural communities of that name in Ontario, Canada:

Communities
Silver Lake, in Peterborough County, part of the municipality of Trent Lakes
Silver Lake, in Renfrew County, part of the municipality of Bonnechere Valley

Lakes
Silver Lake (Kawartha Lakes), on the Gull River
Silver Lake (Lanark–Frontenac), in Lanark and Frontenac Counties